A masonry heater (also called a masonry stove) is a device for warming an interior space through radiant heating, by capturing the heat from periodic burning of fuel (usually wood), and then radiating the heat at a fairly constant temperature for a long period. Masonry heaters covered in tile are called cocklestoves (also tile stoves or ceramic stoves). The technology has existed in different forms, from back into the Neoglacial and Neolithic periods. Archaeological digs have revealed excavations of ancient inhabitants utilizing hot smoke from fires in their subterranean dwellings, to radiate into the living spaces. These early forms have evolved into modern systems.

Evidence found from 5,000 BC of massive blocks of masonry used to retain heat foreshadowed early forms of fire hearths that were used as multifunctional heating sources. The Chinese developed the same principle into their Kang bed-stove.

A masonry heater is defined by ASTM International as "a vented heating system of predominantly masonry construction having a mass of at least , excluding the chimney and masonry heater base. In particular, a masonry heater is designed specifically to capture and store a substantial portion of the heat energy from a solid fuel fire in the mass of the masonry heater through internal heat exchange flue channels, enable a charge of solid fuel mixed with an adequate amount of air to burn rapidly and more completely at high temperatures in order to reduce emission of unburned hydrocarbons, and be constructed of sufficient mass and surface area such that under normal operating conditions, the external surface temperature of the masonry heater (except in the region immediately surrounding the fuel loading door(s)), does not exceed ."

Characteristics 

A masonry heater is made of masonry such as brick (firebrick), soapstone, tile, stone, stucco, or a combination of materials, rather than steel or cast iron. It usually requires special support to bear its weight. It consists of a firebox and heat-exchange channels or partitions that provide additional surface area. These absorb heat from the hot exhaust gases before the gases exit into the chimney. When not being fired, the connection from the masonry heater to the chimney sometimes has a damper to prevent heat from escaping up the chimney; the heat is then radiated from the masonry.

Masonry takes longer to heat than metal; however, once warm, the heater will radiate this heat over a much longer period of time and at a much lower temperature than a metal stove would use (the metal is hot only when there is a fire burning inside the stove and for a short time thereafter). Seating and even beds can be built adjoining the masonry stove; this is possible because the heater's exterior surfaces are cool enough to touch safely. The characteristic of slow heat-release can make a masonry heater a more convenient option for heating a house, than a metal wood stove.

Heat stress is a major concern during the construction of masonry heaters. Differences in temperature inside the masonry core of the heater can result in differential expansion. A skilled heater mason knows how to provide for this stress when designing and constructing the heater, thereby preventing uneven expansion from causing cracking in the exterior. There are two general ways this concern is addressed. One is to incorporate a gap between the inner core of the heater and its outer "skin". The other is to build a more monolithic design with post-tension aspects to mechanically compensate for expansion and contraction.

The speed with which a stove, masonry or otherwise, achieves the right temperature is determined by the specific thickness and characteristics of the materials used in its construction. Very responsive metal heaters warm up faster and are good for quicker adjustments to indoor temperature. Less responsive heaters take longer to warm, but they are better suited for long periods of cold weather because they store and provide heat over a longer period.

The German  (cocklestove) is a relatively large home heater surrounded with ceramic tile, which has existed for at least five centuries. During the Renaissance period in Germany, the builders of such stoves were part of a distinct trade and were called .

A  uses a maze-like passage created out of firebrick to release gases and smoke from the wood fire slowly, allowing the firebrick to retain as much heat as possible from the gases and smoke. The ceramic tile surrounding the stove also acts as insulation to retain heat. Such stoves were carefully designed so that the minimum amount of heat would escape, only as much as needed to warm the flue to maintain a proper air draught. The firebrick used in the construction holds 80% more heat than ferrous metals such as cast iron, while its heat conductivity is 1/45 that of iron or steel. A  is efficient enough to warm a house for up to 6 to 12 hours after the fire has stopped burning.

Russian stove

The Russian stove, another typical masonry heater, evolved in Russia in 15th century, after the brick flue was added to the traditional black-fired fireplace, which lacked the smokestack and vented directly into the room. The addition of the flue allowed for the better heat utilisation by passing the smoke and gases through the brick labyrinth called  ('knees' or 'bends') before allowing it into the smokestack. The large thermal mass of these bends captured the heat, slowly releasing it afterwards. The typical Russian stove is a large, generally cuboid mass of masonry, usually weighing around 1–2 tons, built in the center of a traditional izba log hut, covered in stucco and carefully whitewashed.

Most Russian stoves consist of a massive firebrick hearth, often large enough for a grown man to fit into, with a flue continuing into a maze-like heat exchanger built of a normal brick, usually with a built-in stove for cooking, which sometimes used a secondary fireplace to quickly cook foods without heating the whole affair; all covered with an outer brick shell, normally with a pedestal for a kitchen work and beds built into it. The stove was usually constructed by one of the house's walls, or, in the larger, multi-room houses, was placed in one of the walls, in which case the room without the fireplace, and thus the smoke, but heated by the brick side of the stove, was called  ('light one') and used as a living room, while the other was used as a kitchen.

Finnish stove 

Traditional Finnish stoves closely follow the round Swedish tile heater in appearance, typically constructed from brick. In the late 19th century the idea of using sheet metal rings, instead of tile, caught on in Finland. The first mention of using metal to cover the heater can be found in a Swedish patent application dating to 1878. The metal-clad heater did not catch on in Sweden, but became the most popular masonry heater type in Finland. The metal was typically left bare and was constructed from galvanized sheet metal, it could also be painted.

Clay mortar instead of cement was used in the construction, the chimney exit was often placed at the base of the heater so that the heater could be free standing due to movement from thermal expansion and contraction.

Advantages of covering the heater in sheet metal include the near-elimination of smoke leaks into the room, in turn allowing the heater to be fired more often and to hotter temperatures than its tiled counterpart, which could develop cracks and leak smoke if treated in a similar way. The metal surface was also easy to keep clean. The rings are reusable and once the masonry heater was worn out it could be torn down and rebuilt with new bricks.

The  is still in production in Finland. Modern developments include glass doors, and the secondary combustion of flue gasses via the introduction of fresh air above the flames help meet modern standards. The heater might be built from different materials other than the traditional brick. Brick is still used but in modern heaters the firebox itself is made from high temperature firebrick, the rest of the heater is made from cheaper bricks. In traditional heaters the inside of the firebox was often covered with clay mortar for protection.

Fuel sources 

Since masonry heaters burn hot and fast, they can accept any dry, split wood, usually  in diameter. These heaters are sometimes effectively fired using grass, straw, and hay. It is common in Eastern Europe to modify these heaters so that they are connected to the gas network and are fuelled with gas. Some modern models incorporate electric heating elements connected to a thermostat. The electric heating is required to prevent the building from freezing damage should it be left unattended for long periods during the winter.

Modern development

Some contemporary masonry heaters do not have a ceramic-tile exterior. Instead, the refractory bricks are covered by a heat-resistant kind of plaster. A glass door allows the burning fire to be seen. As in the past, once the firewood has burned, the warmed mass of the stove continues to radiate heat, but the sizes of the flue passages of modern masonry heaters are more exactly calculated to provide increased efficiency and output and use less wood.

Some modern masonry heaters are made out of soapstone, which has particularly high heat retention. In Finland, olivine rock is used as well.

Gallery

See also
 Masonry heating:
  (Korean)
 Hypocaust (Greco-Roman)
 Kang bed-stove (Chinese)
  (Korean)
 Rocket mass heater
 Russian stove
 Fireplace
 Multifuel stove
 Woodburning stove

References

Further reading
 Masonry Heaters: Designing, Building, and Living with a Piece of the Sun by Ken Matesz (Chelsea Green Publishing Co., 2010)
 The Book of Masonry Stoves: Rediscovering an Old Way of Warming by David Lyle (Chelsea Green Publishing Co., 1984)

External links

 Masonry Heater Association
 Fireplaces Magazine: Masonry Heaters

Fireplaces
Heaters
Residential heating appliances
Masonry buildings and structures